Mortal Kombat: Conquest is an American martial arts television series developed by Juan Carlos Coto. Based on the Mortal Kombat fighting game franchise, it aired in syndication for one season from 1998 to 1999. The series serves as a prequel to the games, following the original Kung Lao (Paolo Montalbán) as he protects Earthrealm with the help of bodyguard Siro (Daniel Bernhardt) and former thief Taja (Kristanna Loken). It was one of the first live action shows based on a video game to air on United States television, preceded only by the live action segments of The Super Mario Bros. Super Show!.

Summary
Many centuries ago, Earth was an enchanting and desirable planet. Powerful and rich with natural resources, the vicious megalomaniac Shao Kahn wanted Earth as part of his growing collection of conquered realms known as Outworld. To protect Earth, Mortal Kombat was created: a tournament in which the fate of the planet is decided in battles between competitors from Earthrealm and Outworld. Five hundred years in the past, the monk warrior Kung Lao defeated Shao Kahn's sorcerer, Shang Tsung. When Kung Lao spared his life, Shao imprisoned Shang in the cobalt mines.

Kung Lao now had to train the next generation of warriors, who would give their lives to save Earth. Kung Lao created a partnership and friendship between two warriors: Siro, a former bodyguard, and Taja, an ex-thief. In the mysterious city of Zhuzin, Kung Lao and his new friends are guided and watched over by the thunder god Raiden. The three now battle various evils of both Outworld and Earthrealm, including an imprisoned Shang Tsung, who swore eternal revenge on Kung Lao for his humiliating defeat, and the sultry and seductive Vorpax, who is also imprisoned in the mines and has an agenda of her own.

Cast

Main

 Paolo Montalbán as Kung Lao
 Daniel Bernhardt as Siro
 Kristanna Loken as Taja
 Tracy Douglas as Vorpax
 Bruce Locke as Shang Tsung
 Jeffrey Meek as Raiden and Shao Kahn

Recurring

 John Reilly as Baron Reyland
 Jennifer Renton as Geneviere "Jen" Reyland
 Angelica Bridges as Omegis
 Sung Hi Lee as Kiri
 Tahitia Hicks as Ankha
 Dana Hee as Siann
 Lena Cardwell as Lamera
 Jaime Pressly as Mika
 Renee Tenison as Sora
 Fabiana Udenio as Kreeya
 Roshumba Williams as Qali
 Eva Mendes as Hanna
 Andreea Radutoiu as Jola
 Alexander Walters as Tomas
 Greg Vaughan as Kebral
 Josie Davis as Peron
 Kathleen Kinmont as Dion

Game characters

 Chris Casamassa as Scorpion
 J.J. Perry as Sub-Zero
 Audie England and Dara Tomanovich as Kitana
 Sultan Uddin as Noob Saibot
 Adoni Maropis as Quan Chi
 Megan Brown as Mileena
 Percy "Spitfire" Brown as Rain
 Jim Helsinger as Reiko
 Jon Valera as Reptile

Notable guest appearances
With Conquest immediately following TNT's top-rated program, WCW Monday Nitro, WCW wrestlers Meng and Wrath filmed separate appearances. Former QVC model Dorian John played the barmaid Magda in the episodes "Twisted Truth" and "Quan Chi".

Production and release
Mortal Kombat: Conquest was produced by Threshold Entertainment (who produced the Mortal Kombat film series) in association with New Line Television (television arm of the films' distributor). Warner Bros. Television Distribution distributed the series. The program was filmed at Disney-MGM Studios in Orlando, Florida. The Warner Bros. unit (eventual holder of the Mortal Kombat property), as New Line's corporate sibling-turned-parent, syndicated the series until it was later picked up by TNT, which aired the remaining new episodes in addition to broadcasting repeats of the first-run syndication run. With a lucrative timeslot following WCW Monday Nitro, Conquest was very popular, but according to the show's developer, Joshua Wexler, this resulted in higher budget costs for the show than anticipated. The cancellation was not announced at first, and rumors of a second season circulated. However, TNT pulled the plug on the show, leaving it with a cliffhanger ending. The ending was planned to have been resolved in the second season, which would have summed up the series and corresponded with the MK timeline.

Episodes

Home media
Mortal Kombat: Conquest has been released on DVD in the United Kingdom and Australia, where it enjoyed a more successful run on television. Unofficial collections produced in the UK consist of unrelated and edited episodes merged so that each disc contains a theme, and some of the DVDs contain spelling errors on the covers. Several episodes of the series, consisting of one show per disc, were released in Germany; two of the discs feature episodes centered around Kreeya and Sub-Zero. DVDs were also recently released in Portugal, with many spelling errors on the covers. In 2015, Warner Home Video released Mortal Kombat: Conquest - Season One on DVD in Region 1 for the very first time.

Reception
In 2010, 4thletter! ranked Conquest as sixth on the list of "The Top Ten Most Ridiculous Things to Come Out of Mortal Kombat". In 2011, 1UP.com featured the series in the article "The Top Ten Times Mortal Kombat Went Wrong", calling it a "wire-fu disaster".

References

External links
 
 
 The Mortal Kombat Conquest Site

1998 American television series debuts
1999 American television series endings
American fantasy television series
First-run syndicated television programs in the United States
Martial arts television series
Conquest
American television shows based on video games
Live action television shows based on video games
Television series by Warner Bros. Television Studios
TNT (American TV network) original programming
Television series by New Line Television